Radek Kuděla (born 3 January 1985) is a Czech footballer who currently plays for Czech club FK Fotbal Třinec as a defender.

Career
Born in Vítkov in the Opava district he is a product of the SFC Opava youth system. He broke into the senior side in 2004/05 season making two starts in the Gambrinus Liga. Following the clubs drop of two divisions due to internal issues he moved to Czech 3rd tier side Jakubčovice Fotbal. His first season saw the club's promotion into the 2nd division. The second season saw the newly promoted Jakubčovice finish in a respectable 11th position however they sold their right to play in the division to FK Dukla Prague where the defender duly moved. After a one and a half year spell with Dukla Prague in the second division he moved to another 2nd division outfit FK Fotbal Třinec in 2009. He has gone on to make 68 appearances for the club scoring 1 goal.

External links

1985 births
Living people
Czech footballers
Czech First League players
SFC Opava players
FK Dukla Prague players
FK Fotbal Třinec players
Association football central defenders
People from Vítkov
Sportspeople from the Moravian-Silesian Region